Neighbours Boulevard in Blythe, California contains two designations:

California State Route 78
Interstate 10 Business (Blythe, California)

Streets in Riverside County, California
Blythe, California